Jorden Kyle Lanier Thorpe (born December 29, 1989), better known by his stage name Pardison Fontaine, is an American rapper and songwriter originally from Newburgh, New York.  He is best known for his 2018 single "Backin' It Up" featuring Cardi B, which peaked at number 40 on the US Billboard Hot 100. His debut album Under8ed was released November 15, 2019. Along with his solo career, Thorpe has credits as co-writer in multiple top 20 hits with other artists, including Kanye West ("Yikes", "Ghost Town" and "All Mine"), Cardi B ("Bodak Yellow", "I Like It", "Wild Side", "WAP", and "Up"), and Megan Thee Stallion ("Savage Remix" and "WAP"). In 2021, Thorpe won the Grammy Award for Best Rap Song for his contribution on "Savage Remix".

Career
In August 2015, Fontaine released his debut mixtape, Not Supposed to Be Here. During 2017–2018, he worked with rapper Cardi B. In 2018, Fontaine co-wrote songs for rapper Kanye West's eighth studio album, Ye, such as Violent Crimes". In August 2018, he released the single "Say What I Want". In September 2018, he released the single "Backin' It Up" featuring Cardi B, which reached number 40 on the US Billboard Hot 100 chart. They performed the song live for the first time at the 2018 BET Hip Hop Awards. His work has amassed over a dozen Grammy nominations and two Grammy wins.

Early life and education
Born Jorden Kyle Lanier Thorpe the New York native was raised in a Christian household. Attending Soul Saving Station Church four times a week was an important part of his early childhood. He was not allowed to listen to rap music until his early teens. Being a member of the church choir, he started singing at a young age but fell in love with rap after listening to a DMX mixtape. Thorpe also became a fan of Kanye West, and he began rapping in seventh grade.

Thorpe was a standout Basketball player in High school receiving a full-ride athletic scholarship to Goldey-Beacom College in Wilmington, Delaware to play Division II basketball. He left school midway through his junior year.

He adapted the stage name "Pardi Mcfly" initially inspired by Back to the Future’s Marty McFly. Thorpe since removed Mcfly from his stage name, and later added the name “Fontaine,” partially inspired by Jean de la Fontaine, a famed French poet and fabulist from the 17th century.

Personal life 
Thorpe's daughter was born in November 2016. Pardi has also been in a public relationship with fellow rapper Megan Thee Stallion since 2020.

Discography

Albums

Mixtapes

Singles

As lead artist

As featured artist

Songwriting credits

Credits are courtesy of Discogs, Tidal, Apple Music, and AllMusic.

References

External links
 

1989 births
African-American male rappers
Atlantic Records artists
Grammy Award winners
Living people
21st-century American rappers
21st-century American male musicians
21st-century African-American musicians
20th-century African-American people
Songwriters from New York (state)
African-American male songwriters
Newburgh Free Academy alumni